Alive in Us is an extended play from Fellowship Creative. Fair Trade Services released the EP on March 31, 2015.

Critical reception

Awarding the EP four stars at New Release Today, Marcus Hathcock states, "Alive in Us shows us the apostolic heart of Fellowship Creative's worship ministry by giving the "capital C" Church resources to get people praising." Jay Akins, giving the EP four and a half stars from Worship Leader, writes, "Each song captures and celebrates the powerful work of grace and redemption found in the love of God." Rating the EP three and a half stars for 365 Days of Inspiring Media, Joshua Andre says, "Fellowship Creative for matching the bar that was set high, let’s hope they can match it on their full length sophomore album, or even beat it!"

Awards and accolades
The song, "Jesus Is Alive", was No. 20, on the Worship Leader's Top 20 Songs of 2015 list.

Track listing

Chart performance

References

2015 EPs
Fair Trade Services albums